"Cloudbusting" is a song written, produced and performed by English singer Kate Bush.  It was the second single released from her fifth studio album Hounds of Love (1985). "Cloudbusting" peaked at No. 20 on the UK Singles Chart.

Taking inspiration from the 1973 Peter Reich memoir A Book of Dreams, which Bush read and found deeply moving, the song is about the very close relationship between psychiatrist and philosopher Wilhelm Reich and his young son, Peter, told from the point of view of the mature Peter. It describes the boy's memories of his life with Reich on their family farm, called Orgonon, where the two spent time "cloudbusting", a rain-making process which involved using a machine designed and built by Reich – a machine called a cloudbuster – to point at the sky. The lyrics further describes the elder Reich's abrupt arrest and imprisonment, the pain of loss the young Peter felt, and his helplessness at being unable to protect his father.

In a retrospective review of the single, AllMusic journalist Amy Hanson praised the song for its "magnificence" and "hypnotic mantric effects". Hanson wrote: "Safety and danger are threaded through the song, via both a thoughtful lyric and a compulsive cello-driven melody.  Even more startling, but hardly surprising, is the ease with which Bush was able to capture the moment when a child first realizes that adults are fallible."

In 2014, the song was performed live for the first time and was also chosen as the closing encore track in Bush's comeback live shows titled Before the Dawn, following her 35-year hiatus from the stage.

Music video
The music video, directed by Julian Doyle, was conceived by Terry Gilliam and Kate Bush as a short film. The video features Canadian actor Donald Sutherland playing the role of Wilhelm Reich, and Bush in the role of his young son, Peter. The video shows the two on the top of a hill trying to make the cloudbuster work. Reich leaves Peter on the machine and returns to his lab. In flashback, he remembers several times he and Peter enjoyed together as Reich worked on various scientific projects, until he is interrupted by government officials who arrest him and ransack the lab. Peter senses his father's danger and tries to reach him, but is forced to watch helplessly as his father is driven away. Peter finally runs back to the cloudbuster and activates it successfully, to the delight of his father who sees it starting to rain.

Filming took place at the Vale of White Horse in Oxfordshire, England. The hill on which the machine is positioned is Dragon Hill, immediately below the Uffington White Horse, a prehistoric hill carving which can be seen briefly in a couple of the shots. Bush found out in which hotel Sutherland was staying from actress Julie Christie's hairdresser and went to his room to personally ask him to participate in the project. In the UK, the music video was shown at some cinemas as an accompaniment to the main feature. Due to difficulties on obtaining a work visa for Sutherland at short notice, the actor offered to work on the video for free. Although the events depicted in the story took place in Maine, the newspaper clipping in the music video reads The Oregon Times, likely a reference to Reich's home and laboratory "Orgonon".

The Cloudbusting machine in the video was designed and constructed by people who worked on the Alien creature and bears only a superficial resemblance to the real cloudbusters, which were smaller and with multiple narrow, straight tubes and pipes, and were operated while standing on the ground. In a reference to the source material of the song, Bush pulls a copy of Peter Reich's A Book of Dreams from Sutherland's coat.

The full-length video features a longer version of the song, which is different from the Organon Mix released on 12-inch vinyl. This version was commercially available on "The Red Shoes" single.

Around the time of the release Bush sent Peter Reich a VHS copy of the music video. Reich was immediately a fan. He later told Dazed magazine "Quite magically, this British musician had tapped precisely into a unique and magical fulfilment of father-son devotion, emotion and understanding. They had captured it all."

Track listing
The B-side to the single was "Burning Bridge", in which a woman desperately pleads with her lover to step up his level of commitment to her. The 12" featured the additional track "My Lagan Love", a traditional Irish melody with lyrics by John Carder Bush, Kate Bush's brother. The 12" version of "Cloudbusting" was a special remix called "The Organon Re-Mix" in which the verses were downplayed and the main focus was the development of the song's chorus. In the US, this mix was issued as "The Meteorological Mix", a title used in the UK for 12" version of Bush's later single "The Big Sky".

Personnel
Kate Bush – lead and backing vocals, Fairlight CMI
Stuart Elliott – drums
Charlie Morgan – drums
Paddy Bush – backing vocals
John Carder Bush – backing vocals
Del Palmer – backing vocals
Brian Bath – backing vocals
The Medici String Sextet – strings
David Lawson – string arrangements

Charts

In Australia, "Cloudbusting" narrowly missed the Kent Music Report top 100 singles chart in January 1986.

Certifications

Cover versions

In 1992, Utah Saints sampled the song's line "I just know that something good is going to happen" for their song "Something Good" as well as scenes from Bush's video for their video. It reached No. 4 on the UK Singles Chart and No. 8 when re-mixed and re-released in 2008 (the latter of which used a different sample from another artist). 

Canadian musician Matthew Good covered "Cloudbusting" on his 2015 album Chaotic Neutral. Good's cover version featured Holly McNarland on backing vocals.

References

External links

Watch The Handmaid's Tale | Season 3 Premieres June 5, 2019—Cloudbusting plays at the end of The Handmaid's Tale, Season 3 Episode 11.
Info on the video
More info on the video
Song of the day on thishereboogie, 30 June 2008

1985 songs
1985 singles
Kate Bush songs
Songs written by Kate Bush
Songs based on actual events
Wilhelm Reich
EMI Records singles